Armin Dieter Lehmann (23 May 1928 – 10 October 2008) was a Hitler Youth courier in the Führerbunker towards the end of Adolf Hitler's life, leaving shortly after Hitler committed suicide. He spent his post-war life in travel, tourism, and writing as a peace activist.

Early life
Lehmann was born in 1928 in Waldtrudering, a borough of Munich. Lehmann received his education at Elisabet Gymnasium in Breslau during World War II, and The Journalism School in Munich after the war.

Hitler's last courier
Hitler seized power before I was five years old. It was not my choice to grow up under the form of government in which absolute power is held by a dictator.
At the age of ten, it was mandatory that I join the Deutsches Jungvolk (DJV), the junior branch of the Hitlerjugend or Hitler Youth. In January 1945, I was drafted into the Volkssturm, the home defense. I was decorated (with the Iron Cross) for pulling battle-injured comrades out of the line of fire, after I had been seriously wounded myself.
I was selected by Reichsjugendführer Artur Axmann to be a member of a Hitlerjugend Helden (Hitler Youth Heroes) delegation to visit the Führer in Berlin on his birthday. I met Adolf Hitler in the Reich Chancellery garden (also known as the Hinterhof or backyard) outside his bunker on his last birthday, April 20, 1945. I became one of his last couriers as a member of Axmann’s staff.
During my duty as a courier inside and outside the bunker, I witnessed the total collapse of the Third Reich. I was able to observe the final days of Hitler, Eva Braun, Martin Bormann, and Joseph Goebbels and his family. I was in the adjacent Party Chancellery when Hitler committed suicide.
After Hitler's death, I participated in the bloody breakout from the bunker. Two months later, I succeeded in reaching the American Occupation Zone.

Life in the United States
Lehmann emigrated to the United States in 1953. From 1955 to 1957, Lehmann taught at the United States Armed Forces Institute, and also served as transportation coordinator at Tachikawa AFB in Japan.

For over 40 years, Lehmann worked in the travel and tourism industry as a tour director and operator, as well as a travel industry training specialist and consultant. He lectured extensively as an associate professor in Travel & Tourism for the Airline & Travel Academy, TWA's Breech Academy, and Pacific States University in Los Angeles, California.

Lehmann was the author of ten books, including Travel and Tourism, An Introduction To Travel Agency Operations, and Travel Agency Policy & Procedures Manual. In addition, he wrote more than 200 articles for travel industry trade journals. From 1977-81, Lehmann served as Vice President of Education & Training for the Association of Retail Travel Agents.

In 1969, he was honored with the "Community Leader of America Award." In 1993, Lehmann retired as a travel management consultant and retail travel agency owner. He then spent his time researching, along with developing his memoirs.

Books about his childhood experiences in the Hitler Youth include Hitler's Last Courier and In Hitler’s Bunker, which has been translated into seven different languages. He also produced a documentary film about his experiences as one of Hitler's "boy soldiers", entitled Eyewitness to History.

Peace activism
At the end of World War II, when he was 17, Lehmann decided to devote his life to peace activism. As a peace advocate, Lehmann participated in Professor Linus Pauling's "Campaign For Nuclear Weapons Disarmament."

In the cause of peace, Lehmann traveled to more than 150 countries, speaking out for non-violence, tolerance, and understanding with such other voices as Jawaharlal Nehru and Albert Schweitzer to all who would listen.

Death
Lehmann died in Coos Bay, Oregon, on 10 October 2008. His wife of 29 years, Kim, and daughter, Angie, were at his bedside. The location of his burial was not released to the general public.

See also
Bernd von Freytag-Loringhoven
Rochus Misch

References

Bibliography
Boulé, Margie "From Hitler's bunker to Coos Bay" Oregonian, October 21, 2008.
Joachimsthaler, Anton. The Last Days of Hitler. London: Cassell, 2002.
Knauer, Kelly (ed.). V-E Day. Time: New York, 2005.
Lehmann, Armin D.  Hitler’s Last Courier. Xlibris Corporation, 2000. 
Lehmann, Armin D. and Carroll, Tim. In Hitler’s Bunker. Guilford: The Lyons Press, 2004. 
Lehmann, Armin. Tomorrow’s World: A Book of Peace. Free e-book
Lehmann, Armin D. Resume, 2007.
Lester, Gary. Eyewitness To History (DVD). Port Orange: Blue Heron International Pictures LLC, 2007. http://blueheronpix.com/armin_lehmann_for_peace
North, Oliver. War Stories III. Washington: Regnery Publishing, 2001.

External links
 Lehmann as witness in the Bunker

1928 births
2008 deaths
German anti-war activists
German anti–nuclear weapons activists
German memoirists
German non-fiction writers
German emigrants to the United States
Hitler Youth members
People from Coos Bay, Oregon
People from Munich (district)
Waffen-SS personnel
German male non-fiction writers
20th-century memoirists
Volkssturm personnel
Recipients of the Iron Cross (1939)
Child soldiers in World War II